The Denver Mint is a branch of the United States Mint that struck its first coins on February 1, 1906. The mint is still operating and producing coins for circulation, as well as mint sets and commemorative coins. Coins produced at the Denver Mint bear a D mint mark (as did the Dahlonega Mint, which closed before the Denver branch opened). The Denver Mint is the single largest producer of coins in the world.

History

Clark, Gruber & Co.

The predecessors of the Denver Mint were the men of Clark, Gruber and Company. During the Pikes Peak Gold Rush, they coined gold dust brought from the gold fields by the miners. In 1858, Austin M. Clark, Milton E. Clark and Emanuel Henry Gruber founded a brokerage firm in Leavenworth, Kansas, and then established  an office in Denver at the beginning of the Colorado Gold Rush.  Desiring to save on shipping and insurance costs associated with shipping gold back east, the firm opened a private mint.  On 25 July 1860, the mint opened in a two-story brick building on the corner of Market and 16th Streets, minting $10 gold pieces at the rate of "fifteen or twenty coins a minute".  "On the face is a representation of the peak, its base surrounded by a forest of timber and 'Pikes Peak Gold' encircling the summit.  Immediately under its base is the word 'Denver', and beneath it 'Ten D.'.  On the reverse is the American Eagle encircled by the name of the firm 'Clark, Gruber & Co.', and beneath the date, '1860'."

A $20 gold coin was added, "the weight will be greater, but the value the same as the United States coin of like denomination".  A $5 and a $2.5 gold coin were added, with production reaching $18,000 per week.  On the front was the "head of the Goddess of Liberty surrounded by thirteen stars, with "Clark & Company" in the tiara.  "Pikes's Peak Gold, Denver" was on the other side, with "5D." or "2 1/2 D."

In the almost three years of operation, they minted $594,305 worth of Pike's Peak gold in the form of gold coins.  Additionally, they purchased 77,000 troy ounces of raw gold, and shipped "large amounts of dust" to the Philadelphia Mint.  The building, assaying and minting equipment was formally bought by the US Treasury in April 1863.  Clark, Gruber & Co. remained a bank until bought by the First National Bank of Denver in 1865.

Act of Congress 1862

Established by an Act of Congress on April 21, 1862, the United States Mint at Denver opened for business in late 1863 as a United States Assay Office. Operations began in the facilities of Clark, Gruber and Company, located at 16th and Market Streets and acquired by the government for $25,000, which it was simply able to print off at the location.

Unlike Clark, Gruber and Company, though, the Denver plant performed no coinage of gold as first intended. One reason given by the Director of the Mint for the lack of coinage at Denver was, "…the hostility of the Indian tribes along the routes, doubtless instigated by rebel emissaries (there being a Civil War) and bad white men."

Gold and nuggets brought there by miners from the surrounding area were accepted by the Assay Office for melting, assaying, and stamping of cast gold bars. The bars were then returned to the depositors as imparted bars stamped with the weight and fineness of the gold. Most of the gold came from the rich beds of placer gold found in the streams and first discovered in 1858, the same year Denver was founded.

When the supply of gold was exhausted from the streams, the emphasis turned to lode mining, uncovering veins of ore with a high percentage of gold and silver. By 1859, the yearly value of the gold and silver deposited at the Assay Office was over $5.6 million. During its early years as an Assay Office, the Denver plant was the city's most substantial structure.

Continuing history
The United States Treasury did not expand its smelting and refining operations at the same rate as the discovery and production of gold. In 1872 a group of businessmen led by Judge Hiram Bond (formerly one of the largest brokers on the New York Gold Exchange), Joseph Miner and Denver Mayor Joseph E. Bates set up a firm Denver Smelting and Refining Works which built an independent complementary plant which processed ore into ingots which were then assayed, weighed and stamped by the Denver Mint.

There was new hope for branch mint status when Congress provided for the establishment of a mint at Denver for gold and silver coin production. The site for the new mint at West Colfax and Delaware streets was purchased on April 22, 1896, for approximately $60,000. Construction began in 1897.

Appropriations to complete and equip the plant were insufficient, and the transfer of assay operations to the new building were delayed until September 1, 1904. Coinage operations finally began on February 1, 1906, advancing the status of the Denver facility to Branch Mint. In addition, before the new machinery to be used at the Mint was installed for use, it was first sent to the St. Louis Exposition of 1904 for display. Silver coins were minted in Denver for the first time in 1906. During the first year, 167 million coins were produced, including $20 gold (double eagle) coins, $10 gold (eagle) coins, $5 gold (half eagle) coins, and assorted denominations of silver coins.

The mint was individually listed on the National Register of Historic Places in 1972.  It was further included as a contributing building in the listing of Civic Center Historic District in 1974.

Today, the Denver Mint produces commemorative coins, coin dies and uncirculated coin sets. It has a production capacity of more than 50 million coins a day and roughly 350 employees.

The mint in popular culture
 The Denver Mint is featured in the 1993 Sylvester Stallone film Cliffhanger, as the production point of the money stolen in the film, and the departure point for the plane.
 The Denver Mint appears anachronistically in the 1870s in the 1967 The Wild Wild West episode "The Night of the Circus of Death".
 Similarly to above, The Mint is also anachronistically set in the 1870s in the 1960 Shotgun Slade episode "The Missing Train".
 The Denver Mint is referenced in the title of a Jimmy Eat World track from the album Clarity called Lucky Denver Mint.
 In the 1969 Burt Reynolds film Sam Whiskey, the Denver Mint is the scene of a reverse-heist; gold previously stolen from it had to be covertly returned to protect the reputation of the late thief's widow. 
 In the 1959 Maverick episode "Full House", Bret Maverick, played James Garner, was mistaken by several high profile outlaws for the outlaw leader they were there to meet. Bret came up with a plan to rob the Denver Mint, but his real plan was to have them arrested during the robbery so he could collect the bounties on the others.

See also

 Gold mining in Colorado
 List of Mints
 Historical United States mints
 Silver mining in Colorado

References

External links 

 The U.S. Mint
 Visitors' information at the Denver Mint

1862 establishments in Colorado Territory
Buildings and structures in Denver
Colorado State Register of Historic Properties
Government buildings on the National Register of Historic Places in Colorado
Industrial buildings and structures on the National Register of Historic Places in Colorado
Manufacturing plants in the United States
Mints of the United States
National Register of Historic Places in Denver
Tourist attractions in Denver
United States Mint
Civic Center Historic District (Denver, Colorado)
Historic district contributing properties in Colorado